Touros (lit. "bulls") is a municipality in Rio Grande do Norte, Brazil. It is known as "Brazil's Corner" because it is located at the northeast corner of the country, being the closest South American city to Africa (2,841 km from Kabrousse in southwestern Senegal). Touros has many fish, and there is a nearby seawater basin in the ocean formed by banks of coral.

Bordering municipalities include Rio do Fogo to the southeast, Pureza to the south, João Câmara to the southwest, Parazinho further to the west and São Miguel do Gostoso to the northwest.

Touros is near Rio Carnaubinha.

Districts
Touros are divided into 27 districts and subdivisions:

Arribão
Assentamento Aracati
Assentamento Canudos
Assentamento Chico Mendes I
Assentamento Chico Mendes II
Assentamento Planalto do Retiro
Santo Antônio
Baixa do Quinquim
Boa Cica
Boqueirão
Cajá
Cajueiro
Carnaubal
Carnaubinha
Geral
Golandim
Lagoa de Serra Verde
Lagoa do Sal
Monte Alegre
Perobas
Santa Luzia
São José
Tubiba
Vila Assis
Vila Israel
Vila Mayne
Zabelê.

History
In the 1790s, a drought occurred in Rio Grande do Norte in the last decade brought agricultural farms and workers into Touros, where the land was fertile and for use in agriculture.

The settlement became a district on September 5, 1823 and later in 1832, the parish of Bom Jesus de Navegantes was formed and later on April 11, 1833, the resolution of the provincial council elevated Touros to a town, it also separated from Ceará-Mirim (now the state of Ceara) and became part of Rio Grande do Norte. The municipality was created under provincial law no. 21 on March 27, 1835.

Its municipality was large, it had 180 km of coastline. Later, its own municipalities were created from Touros including Maxaranguape, Pureza in 1962 and São Miguel do Gostoso (ex-São Miguel de Touros).

Area attractions 
Brazil's The second largest lighthouse, the Farol do Calcanhar is in the city of Touros. The vila Galé hotel is also a tourist attraction

Transportation 
The northernmost section of the BR-101 highway is located in Touros, which is the longest highway in Brazil.

Flag and seal
Its seal is a crest which features the main attraction, the lighthouse in the middle. Inside has four parts, purple on top left and bottom left and the other two white, on bottom left is a palm tree and on the bottom right is a sailboat in the waters.

Its flag color is light blue with a white start, inside is the coat of arms but has its parts in light blue.

Nature
Not only fauna that the area has but even in the seas, where there are marine such as fishes, mollusks and others. One cone snail species native to the Atlantic of the east of Touros is Conus tourosensis which has been recently described in March 2018.

References

External links

Populated places established in 1835
Populated coastal places in Rio Grande do Norte
Municipalities in Rio Grande do Norte